Red Fleet State Park is a state park of Utah, United States, featuring a  reservoir and a fossil trackway of dinosaur footprints.

Geography

The climate is arid, with hot summers and cold winters. Surrounded by red slick rock formations, the park got its name from three large Navajo sandstone outcrops that look like a fleet of ships as they jut up from the reservoir.

Plant life at the park includes juniper, various cacti, and sagebrush.

Wildlife includes badgers, bobcat, coyote, deer, and rabbit. Birds include golden eagles, hawks, bluebirds, vultures, owls, and osprey.

Park facilities
Year-round park facilities include a sand beach, boat launching ramp, restrooms, 29 RV campsites, a picnic area, sewage disposal, and fish cleaning stations. Recently a dinosaur trackway dating back 200 million years was discovered in the area. Nearby attractions include Dinosaur National Monument, Flaming Gorge National Recreation Area, Steinaker and Utah Field House of Natural History state parks, and rafting and fishing on the Green River.

Red Fleet Dam
The reservoir is fed by Big Bush Creek and is part of the CUP-Jensen Unit project. It was constructed in 1980.

References

External links

 Red Fleet State Park

Fossil trackways in the United States
Protected areas established in 1988
Protected areas of Uintah County, Utah
State parks of Utah
Reservoirs in Utah
Dams in Utah
United States Bureau of Reclamation dams
Dams completed in 1980
Lakes of Uintah County, Utah
Buildings and structures in Uintah County, Utah
Fossil parks in the United States
1988 establishments in Utah
Paleontology in Utah